Qaraqat Jaqsylyqqyzy Äbden (born 7 May 1974) is a Kazakh politician, economist and writer who served as a member of the Astana City Mäslihat from 2016 to 2021. Since 2013, she currently heads the Qazaq Qyzy public association as a chairwoman, "Asyl Böbek" Association of Private Preschool Organisations, as well as several nurseries in the city of Astana. Äbden is known to be an author of a controversial book You are Kazakh. Be proud!.

Äbden initially worked as economist in private commercial firms before transferring to a state job relating to tax issues under several government ministries. From there, she became a member of the ruling Amanat party where she held various positions within the party's structure. She is currently serving as a freelance adviser to the Äkim of Astana on social issues.

For the 2022 presidential elections was nominated as a candidate by the National Alliance of Professional Social Workers.

Biography

Early life and education 
Äbden was born in 1974 at the village of 22 Partsyezda in Akmola Region to the parents of Jaqsylyq Äbdenov and Rysbala Şalabaeva. Her father, Äbdenov, worked as a construction worker while her mother Şalabaeva was a teacher. As a child, she attended the secondary school No. 10 in the village of Jäirem in Ulytau Region, from where completed it with a gold medal. After graduating, she entered the Almaty Institute of National Economy, obtaining a degree in marketing and commerce. She also became a Candidate of Economic Sciences after defending her thesis on the topic "Formation of revenues of local budgets using non-production payments".

Career 
Äbden began her career as an economist of the Orda private commercial firm in Almaty. Then she served as a leading specialist of the Department of Large Taxpayers under the Ministry of State Revenues of Kazakhstan. For 10 years beginning in 1999, Äbden worked in the Ministry of Finance where she was the acting head of several tax committees with it being the Department of Taxpayer Monitoring, chief specialist of the Tax Appeals Department, head of the Department for Work with Taxpayers of the Interregional Tax Committee No. 1, Head of the Department of non-production payments, chief expert of the Control Department No. 4 of the Financial Control Committee.

From 2009, she was the deputy director of the National School of Public Policy of the Academy of Public Administration under the President of Kazakhstan and worked within the Nur Otan as a head of the Sector of Analytics and Coordination of the party's Higher Party School, consultant to the Innovation Committee of the party's central office in Astana until 2013, when she founded the Qazaq Qyzy public association, Kazakhstan's first women's institute of cultural and moral education and the "Asyl Böbek" Association of Private Preschool Organisations in Astana. In the eve of International Women's Day on 4 March 2016, Äbden was amongst the women in the traditional meeting of "Koktem şuağy" ("Spring Sunshine") upon which was attended by President Nursultan Nazarbayev.

On 20 Match 2016, Äbden was elected as a Nur Otan councillor for the sixth convocation of the Nur-Sultan City Mäslihat, representing the 19th constituency which was previously held by Qairat Jauhanov. From there, she served as member of the Commission on Issues of Sociocultural Development.

"You are Kazakh. Be proud!" 
On 5 December 2019, Äbden presented her book titled You are Kazakh. Be proud! (Сен қазақтың қызысың. Мақтан ет!), which discusses the role of a modern Kazakh woman in Kazakhstani society and the need to observe traditions while criticising feminism. The publication upon its limited release with most of them set for donation towards libraries of rural schools and orphanages gained public controversy and was criticism by some of promoting nationalist and sexist values. Others questioned the use state funding towards Äbden's Qazaq Qyzy public association and accused her of allegedly using taxpayers' money to fund her book release to which more than 17.5 million tenge was allocated for. In response to wide criticism, Äbden claimed that many of things were taken out of context and insisted that she was in fact, supportive of feminism.

References

External links 
 Official website (in Kazakh)
 Personal reference (in Russian)

1974 births
Living people
People from Akmola Region
Kazakhstani politicians
Kazakhstani economists
Kazakhstani women
Nur Otan politicians
Kazakhstani writers